Athiyannur is a town in Thiruvananthapuram district in the state of Kerala, India.

Demographics

As of the 2011 Census of India, Athiyannur had a population of 40,712 with 19,711 males and 21,001 females.

References

Villages in Thiruvananthapuram district